NPO 1 (NPO een, formerly Nederland 1  until 2014) is the first national television station in the Netherlands. It launched on 2 October 1951. It provides public broadcasting and currently exists next to sister channels NPO 2 and NPO 3. Several broadcasting organisations of the Publieke Omroep deliver a wide variety of programs for the channel, usually for larger audiences. In 2018, it was the most viewed channel in the Netherlands, reaching a market share of 22.0%.

History

Early years, the 50s
In the Netherlands the first television experiments took place in the 1930s. Dutch technology company Philips played an important role in these experiments. In 1951 public radio broadcasters AVRO, KRO, VARA and NCRV established the NTS, Nederlandse Televisie Stichting (Dutch Television Foundation). The very first public broadcast began from studio Irene in Bussum on 2 October 1951 at 8:15 pm. It was transmitted from Lopik, soon followed by Hilversum as well. On 5 January 1956 the NTS broadcast their first news programme, NTS Journaal. In the 1950s television attracted only a low number of viewers. The high prices of television sets were the main reason why. During the 1950s television became available nationally by the introduction of more transmitters and repeaters in Goes, Roosendaal, Loon op Zand, Mierlo, Roermond, Markelo, Ugchelen, Zwolle, Smilde and the new Gerbrandy Tower in IJsselstein.

Creation of Nederland 1
From October 1960 NTS began broadcasting daily from 8:00 pm till 10:20 pm. Two years later the broadcasting hours were extended from 26 to 30 hours a week. On 1 October 1964, a second public television channel began broadcasting, Nederland 2 and the first public broadcasting channel was renamed into Nederland 1. In 1967, colour television broadcasts were introduced by using the PAL-system. Also in that same year advertising between programmes was introduced. In 1969 the Dutch government adopted the so-called open-system for the public broadcasting system, allowing more public broadcasting organisations. Though, a potential new organisation must have 100,000 members or more to be allowed in. On 29 May 1969, the NTS and the Dutch Radio Union (NRU) merged into the NOS serving as an umbrella organisation for the public broadcasting organisations. Its main focus is on general news and sports broadcasts and also provides technical and administrative coordination.

Launch of Nederland 3
In anticipation of the launch of new commercial channels broadcast by satellite, a third television network, Nederland 3 launched in April 1988. After the launch of Nederland 3 in 1988, Nederland 1 was the mainstay of the broadcasters KRO, NCRV, VARA and EO. On 30 September 1991, Nederland 1 introduced a new logo which depicts a yellow "1"-numeral that is placed inside a blue diamond, and at the same time, VARA was moved to Nederland 2, while AVRO moved to this channel, thus earning the nickname AKN (AVRO-KRO-NCRV). Another restructuring was made on 28 September 1992 when Nederland 1 abolished in-vision continuity, in favour for voiceover continuity and at the same time, religious and humanism broadcasters moved from Nederland 3 to Nederland 1, where they were given more airtime for their output. In return, EO moved to Nederland 2, before making their programming output available on all three channels on 24 August 2000 before the huge revamp from 4 September 2006.

Luxembourg-based RTL-Véronique began broadcasting in October 1989. In 1992, the government of the Netherlands legalised commercial television, and a number of new commercial channels were established resulting in a reduction in the market share of the public networks.

Transition to (U)HD and the NPO
Until 2006 each public broadcasting organisation had been associated with just one channel, being either Nederland 1, Nederland 2 or Nederland 3. In the 2006/2007 season, the three channels got re-arranged. Nederland 1 became the flagship television channel aimed at a wide audience, Nederland 2 got a more highbrow programming with news, current affairs and documentaries and Nederland 3 is oriented towards children, youth and innovative television. The NOS is no longer the coordinating organisation. This function is taken over by the newly formed NPO.

On 16 September 2007, Nederland 1, Nederland 2 and Nederland 3 switched completely to anamorphic widescreen—before that time, only some of the programming was broadcast in widescreen. On 4 July 2009, all three channels began simulcasting in 1080i high-definition. Before the launch of the permanent HD service, a test version of the Nederland 1 HD channel was made available from 2 June 2008 until 24 August 2008 in order to broadcast Euro 2008, the 2008 Tour de France, the 2008 Summer Olympics, and De Simpsons in HD.

On 12 March 2013, the NPO announced that Nederland 1, 2 and 3 would be renamed as NPO 1, 2 and 3. The reason for this change is to make the channels and its programmes more recognizable. The rebranding completed on 19 August 2014.

NPO 1 launched its first trials with ultra-high-definition television through KPN, CanalDigitaal and some minor networks on 14 June 2018, using the HLG standard.

KPN started to switch its digital terrestrial television platform to the DVB-T2 HEVC standard in October 2018, this transition completed on 9 July 2019. Since then NPO 1 is also available FTA in HD.

Programming
Currently, most of the biggest productions of Dutch public broadcasting television programs are shown on NPO 1, sometimes called the flagship of the NPO. Some notable programmes broadcast through the year are:

1 Translation added only when it clarifies the original title of the programme. 
2 Special, extra long broadcasts are made during important events such as the FIFA World Cup, the Tour de France or the Olympic Games.

Logos and identities

See also
 Netherlands Public Broadcasting

References

External links
 NPO 1 website 

Television channels in the Netherlands
1951 establishments in the Netherlands
Television channels and stations established in 1951
Netherlands Public Broadcasting